The Ipoh City Council (abbreviated MBI) is the city council which administers the city of Ipoh in the state of Perak, Malaysia. This council was established after the city was officially granted city status on 27 May 1988. Their jurisdiction covers an area of 643 square kilometres.

The council consists of the mayor plus twenty-four councillors appointed to serve a one-year term by the Perak State Government. MBI is responsible for public health and sanitation, waste removal and management, town planning, environmental protection and building control, social and economic development and general maintenance functions of urban infrastructure

History
Ipoh City Council started as a Sanitary Board in 1893, formed by the British. From its gradual and sturdy development, it obtained its Municipal status in 1962 and was declared a city on 27 May 1988.

In general, the Ipoh City Council as the local authority, is a Corporate Body established under the Local Government Act 1976 (Act 171), being the body responsible for managing the Ipoh City area based on local interest, as well as a local planning authority under the Town and Country Planning Act 1976 (Act 172); MBI is directly tasked by Law to formulate and implement development planning policies based on centralised locality in accordance to the policies set by the Government.

Currently, the boundary of the Council covers an area of 643 square kilometres with a population of over 720,000 people. As the state capital of Perak, Ipoh serves as the centre of administration, commerce, sports, finance, politics, religion and education. Now under the leadership of the Mayor, the Ipoh City Council continues its effort to transform the city into a dynamic and distinguished city.

Appointed mayors of Ipoh

Current appointed councillors

2023/2024 Session

Departments
Pejabat Korporat Bandaraya
Jabatan Kesihatan
Jabatan Perlesenan dan Penguatkuasaan
Jabatan Penilaian & Pengurusan Harta
Jabatan Kejuruteraan
Jabatan Perancang
Jabatan Kewangan
Jabatan Landskap & Rekreasi
Jabatan Hal Ehwal Komuniti 
Jabatan Bangunan
Jabatan Khidmat Pengurusan
Pejabat Penasihat Undang-Undang
Pejabat Audit Dalaman
Pejabat Pesuruhjaya Bangunan (COB)
Pejabat OSC (One Stop Centre)
Pejabat Pembangunan Projek Khas Bandaraya

Administration Area
Below are the administration area for Ipoh City Council which further breakdown into 24 zones.

Former Appointed Councillors

July 2018-July 2019 Session

1 Mei 2021-30 April 2023 Session

References

External links

Ipoh
Ipoh
City councils in Malaysia